The Last Chapter may refer to:

The Last Chapter, book by Knut Hamsun
Fallada: The Last Chapter 1988 East German drama film
The Last Chapter, miniseries drama about Canadian biker gangs Dan Bigras 2002
The Last Chapter (album), Reggaeton compilation
Terrorizer: The Last Chapter album by Dispatched 2003